Totality is the sixth album by American progressive rock band The Flyin' Ryan Brothers, released on June 13, 2008.

Track listing

Personnel
Jimmy Ryan – electric guitars, lap steel guitar, glockenspiel, sitar, theremin, production
Johnny Ryan – electric guitars, acoustic guitars, accordion, sitar, keyboards, production
William Kopecky – bass
Johnny Mrozek – drums, percussion
Chris Djuricic – mixing, mastering

References

The Flyin' Ryan Brothers albums
2008 albums